Vitor de Paula Braga (born 23 November 1953), known as Vitor, is a former Brazilian footballer who played at Cruzeiro and Santos FC.

References

1953 births
Living people
Brazilian footballers
Brazil international footballers
Olympic footballers of Brazil
Footballers at the 1972 Summer Olympics
Association football goalkeepers
Cruzeiro Esporte Clube players